Hauteroche is a commune in the Jura department of eastern France. The municipality was established on 1 January 2016 and consists of the former communes of Crançot, Granges-sur-Baume and Mirebel.

See also 
Communes of the Jura department

References 

Communes of Jura (department)